Ngen, or Shark Bay, is one of the East Santo languages group of languages. It is spoken on Espiritu Santo in Vanuatu. It has about 450 speakers. It is close to Lorediakarkar.

References

Languages of Vanuatu
Endangered Austronesian languages
Espiritu Santo languages
Vulnerable languages